Mischief Reef, also known as Panganiban Reef (Mandarin ), is a low tide elevation (LTE) reef/atoll surrounding a large lagoon in the SE of Dangerous Ground in the east of the Spratly Islands in the South China Sea. Administratively, it belonged to the Kalayaan Islands municipality of the province of Palawan. It is also under de facto jurisdiction of Nansha islands, Sansha City, Hainan province, China. Activities by the People's Republic of China (PRC) in the mid-2010s have created a large artificial island on the atoll which has included an approximately  runway and associated airfield.

Although the reef is well within the Philippines' EEZ and traditional fishing grounds, Mischief Reef has been controlled by the PRC since 1995, and is also claimed by the Republic of China (Taiwan), and Vietnam.

The reef was the subject of a 2016 tribunal ruling by the Permanent Court of Arbitration in The Hague, where the landmark ruling the Nine Dash Line as moot and without basis. Mischief reef was also ruled as a low tide elevation (LTE) meaning it cannot possess a territorial 12 mile-boundary regardless of the reclamation and a military base installation by the PRC. Their moves only heightened the tension with the Philippines, resulting to a massive defense acquisition of this archipelagic nation.  

The area is said to be rich in as of yet unexplored oil and gas fields.

History and etymology
One source says that Mischief reef was discovered by Henry Spratly in 1791 and was named after the clipper Mischief that sailed regularly in the South China Sea in the 1850s.

Location and description
It lies 50 nautical miles east of Union Banks. Mischief reef consists of a large lagoon and rocks that lie above water at low tide.

Territorial disputes 

In 1994 and 1995, China built initial structures on stilts in the area. The Philippine government protested these actions. However, the Chinese government rejected the protest and said that the structures were shelter for fishermen. In 1999, another wave of protests from Manila occurred when China added more structures to Mischief Reef.

China was also reported to have planted buoys in nearby Sabina Shoal. The Philippines claimed that China had a well-rehearsed routine when laying claim to a new reef: first put down buoys, then build concrete markers. Temporary wooden or bamboo shelters followed, and then permanent structures went up. The Philippines therefore would try to destroy the buoys or markers before China has time to build larger structures. The Philippines' decision not to destroy the Chinese structures on Mischief Reef has prevented an escalation of the dispute. The Philippines claims that China has always been prepared for armed conflict when challenged, as is evident in China's defense of reefs from Vietnam in the 1988 Johnson South Reef Skirmish which resulted in more than 70 Vietnamese deaths.

On 11 July 2012, the Chinese Type 053 frigate Dongguan ran aground on the reef, sparking embarrassment for the Chinese government and causing an awkward diplomatic situation. The ship was later towed back to base.

On 12 July 2016, the tribunal of the Permanent Court of Arbitration concluded that Mischief Reef is, or in their natural condition was, exposed at low tide and submerged at high tide and are, accordingly low-tide elevations that do not generate entitlement to a territorial sea, exclusive economic zone or continental shelf. The tribunal concluded that Mischief Reef forms part of the exclusive economic zone and continental shelf of the Philippines.

Military development
In 2014, land reclamation started inside the rims. The Philippines filed a diplomatic protest against China after the discovery of their reclamation activities. By January 2016, work was well advanced on developing a military base with a large harbour and a  runway, with the reclaimed land covering . A civilian test flight to the runway was conducted by a China Southern Airlines passenger jet on 13 July 2016.

In late 2016, photographs emerged which suggested that Mischief Reef was armed with anti-aircraft weapons and a CIWS missile-defence system.

In early 2021, satellite imagery and third party geointelligence analysis confirmed a radome and possible antenna mount, among other construction preparations underway on Mischief Reef.

Meiji Airport

See also
 Fiery Cross Reef
 Great wall of sand
 Nine-dash line
 Subi Reef

References

Further reading

External links

Asia Maritime Transparency Initiative Island Tracker

Reefs of the Spratly Islands
Reefs of China
Reefs of the Philippines
Reefs of Taiwan
Reefs of Vietnam
Disputed reefs
Artificial islands of Asia
Coastal fortifications
Landforms of Khánh Hòa province